Litter is a notified area and a town  in Pulwama district of Jammu and Kashmir, India. It is situated on the banks of Rambi Ara, which line Litter Pulwama with Aglar.

The tehsil headquarters of Shahoora tehsil are located in Litter.

The main locations which attracts people is the shrine of Ziyarat-e-Sayiddah , which is under maintained by Tourist Department, which enhances the beauty of town.

Transport 
Litter is well traffic connected with Pulwama, Anantnag and Shopian.
The nearest railway stations to Litter are Bijbehara railway station and Panzgam railway station.

Education 

A government higher secondary school, government boys and girls school and few ssa schools are also in the two.
Besides government schools there are 4-5 private schools located in the area.

References 

Cities and towns in Pulwama district